A plaint number is "an old-fashioned term for a claim number".

It was formerly used in the British court system.  The term continues to be used in Australia, and searches for court records in Australian use the plaint number.

Claims under administrative law for medical malpractice or other professional misconduct may also use a plaint number.

See also
 Allocation questionnaire
 Docket
 Lawsuit
 Mental health courts

References

Civil procedure